BLOXR is a healthcare technology company based in Salt Lake City, Utah. BLOXR specializes in designing products that protect medical professionals from radiation exposure without the use of lead or other toxic heavy metals. In 2012, BLOXR created a line of patented products that incorporates XPF technology for medical, dental, and veterinary professionals for radiation attenuation purposes. XPF products include two layers — one of barium sulfate, and the other of bismuth oxide, which perform equivalently to 0.5 mm lead.

BLOXR does not use lead or any other toxic heavy metals in their products. It is the only truly "green" product in the industry.

References

Medical technology companies of the United States